Cynisca (foaled 1886 in New Zealand) was a Thoroughbred mare racehorse named for the Spartan princess Cynisca who became the first woman in history to win at the ancient Olympic Games when she won the four-horse chariot race in 396 BC.

The New Zealand mare is best remembered for winning three consecutive Wellington Cups. She was owned by Sir George Clifford and George Hunter.

See also
 Repeat winners of horse races

References

 Cynisca's pedigree and partial racing stats

1886 racehorse births
Racehorses bred in New Zealand
Racehorses trained in New Zealand
Wellington Cup winners
Thoroughbred family 14-e